Coal and Candle Creek is a creek located in Sydney, Australia. It is a tributary of Cowan Creek which flows into the Hawkesbury River.

See also
Cottage Point, New South Wales

References

Creeks and canals of Sydney
Hawkesbury River